The 2022 Western & Southern Open was a men's and women's tennis tournament played on outdoor hard courts from August 15–21, 2022, as part of the US Open Series. It was a Masters 1000 tournament on the 2022 ATP Tour and a WTA 1000 tournament on the 2022 WTA Tour.

The 2022 tournament was the 121st men's edition and the 94th women's edition of the Cincinnati Masters and took place at the Lindner Family Tennis Center in Mason, Ohio, a northern suburb of Cincinnati, in the United States.

Points and prize money

Point distribution

Prize money

*per team

Champions

Men's singles

  Borna Ćorić def.  Stefanos Tsitsipas, 7–6(7–0), 6–2

This was Ćorić's third ATP Tour singles title, and first of the year.

Women's singles

  Caroline Garcia def.  Petra Kvitová, 6–2, 6–4.

This was Garcia's 10th WTA Tour singles title, and third of the year. This was her third WTA 1000 title, and her first since 2017.

Men's doubles

  Rajeev Ram /  Joe Salisbury def.  Tim Pütz /  Michael Venus, 7–6(7–4), 7–6(7–5)

Women's doubles

  Lyudmyla Kichenok /  Jeļena Ostapenko def.  Nicole Melichar-Martinez /  Ellen Perez, 7–6(7–5), 6–3

References

External links
 

2022 ATP Tour
2022 WTA Tour
 
2022
Cincinnati
August 2022 sports events in the United States
2022 in American tennis